The 1904 United States presidential election in Kansas took place on November 8, 1904. All contemporary 45 states were part of the 1904 United States presidential election. Kansas voters chose ten electors to the Electoral College, which selected the president and vice president.

Kansas was won by the Republican nominees, incumbent President Theodore Roosevelt of New York and his running mate Charles W. Fairbanks of Indiana.

Results

Results by county

See also
 United States presidential elections in Kansas

Notes

References

Kansas
1904
1904 Kansas elections